Towner Art Gallery is located in Eastbourne, East Sussex, on the south coast of England.

It hosts one of the most significant public art collections in the South of England and draws over 100,000 visitors a year. It was described by ITV News as "the region's biggest art gallery", in 2017.

It was established with a bequest in 1920, from John Chisholm Towner who had served as a local alderman. It was first homed in Manor Gardens, adjacent to Gildredge Park in the Old Town area of Eastbourne. Opening there in 1923, it closed when the building was sold in 2005. In 2009, it re-opened in a purpose-built facility adjacent to the Congress Theatre, near Eastbourne's seafront. The venue will host the 2023 Turner Prize.

History

The Towner Gallery was established as a project in 1920 following the death that year of Alderman John Chisholm Towner, who left 22 paintings, £6,000 and instructions for the establishment of an art gallery. This bequest was made for the benefit of the people of Eastbourne; the undertaking was entrusted to a local group of supporters and the local council.

1923 opening

For 72 years, the Gallery was located within a Manor House on the High Street in the Old Town area. The Manor House, located within its own Manor Gardens, dated to the 18th century, but was taken over in the 1920s for public use as a public gallery and local museum, following Towner's bequest.

A noted historic building in Eastbourne, the Manor House is dwarfed in age by its neighbours; being opposite the Lamb Inn, dating back to 1180AD and St Mary's Church, from the same period. Despite having been owned by the town as a public facility for most of the 20th century, the Manor House and gardens were sold in 2005/6 by the local authority, Eastbourne Borough Council.

2005–2009: no gallery or museum

In 2009, after a gap of several years during which Eastbourne had no local art gallery or museum, Towner reopened in a purpose-built gallery building adjacent to the Congress Theatre. Funders of the new gallery included the Heritage Lottery Fund and Eastbourne Borough Council.

2009: new building

Designed by Rick Mather Architects and built mainly from concrete, at a cost of £8.6m, the new gallery building was planned to be more easily accessible to the public and to store the 4,000 works of the growing collection in a safe and climate-controlled manner. Visually, it was designed to reflect the chalk cliffs of the Eastbourne Downs.

Unlike the old building, no provision was made to incorporate a local museum, though substantially more space was created for a café, shop and larger exhibitions.

2014: transfer of ownership from Eastbourne Borough Council

In 2014, Eastbourne Borough Council transferred operation of the Gallery to a newly-created independent charitable trust. David Dimbleby was appointed the Chair of Trustees. The Council retained ownership of the Gallery's building and its collection of artworks.

2017: threats of closure

Despite no longer directly operating the Gallery, Eastbourne Borough Council remained a major annual funder, alongside Arts Council England.

In 2017, cuts in the local authority's funding of 50% were proposed. This threatens the gallery with closure to some or all of its services and the greater use of admission charges for access to public art.

2022: Refurbishment 
From 2021 to 2022 the Gallery significantly remodelled its ground floor and cinema to "improve the visitor experience, build visitor engagement and increase Towner’s financial sustainability." Design was led by architects Manalo & White.

Collections and exhibitions

Towner Collection

The Towner Collection is one of the most significant public art collections in the South East of England.

It boasts in excess of 5,000 works of art by historic, modern and contemporary artists including: Lawrence Alma-Tadema, John Gascoigne Lake, Vanessa Bell, David Bomberg, Alan Davie, Tacita Dean, Olafur Eliasson, Anya Gallaccio, Thomas Jones, Peter Liversidge, Henry Moore, Cedric Morris, William Nicholson, Julian Opie, Ian Potts, Victor Pasmore, Pablo Picasso, Eric Ravilious, Eric Slater, Wolfgang Tillmans, Alfred Wallis, Christopher Wood, Joseph Wright of Derby and Carol Wyatt.

The initial collection consisted mainly of Victorian narrative painting, especially pictures of animals and children. The current collection now includes oil paintings, watercolours, works on paper, etchings, prints, sculpture, wood cuts, ceramic objects, installations and video art.

Since the gallery was established it has received donations of work by significant artists including: Walter Sickert, Pablo Picasso, Henry Moore, Victor Pasmore, Alfred Wallis, Frances Hodgkins, Phelan Gibb and David Bomberg.

By 1962 the Observer said it was "the most go-ahead municipal gallery of its size in the country". This was mainly because of the purchase of a group of works by modern abstract artists of the 1950s and 1960s. In 1962, the Rector of Berwick Church gave over 35 studies and sketches for the Berwick Church murals.

As a result of the first curator's ‘Pictures of Sussex’ policy the Towner Collection gradually increased. Pictures were acquired of subjects relating to Sussex. This scheme was later extended to allow inclusion of pictures executed by Sussex artists regardless of subject matter.

A key element of the collection is the work of Eric Ravilious, who studied and taught at Eastbourne School of Art. In 1982, the family of the artist deposited on loan an important body of his work. The Towner holds the broadest collection of paintings, illustrations and commercial designs in the world, by this important modern British artist of the early 20th century.

South East Arts Collection of Contemporary Art

As a result of an agreement made in 1983, the Towner houses the South East Arts Collection of Contemporary Art. Further bequests in 1988 and 1990 considerably enhanced the collection, and the commitment to purchasing contemporary art was recognised nationally.

Exhibitions

The Towner Art Gallery's first curator started the practice of arranging temporary exhibitions to be shown alongside displays from the permanent collection which have become a major feature of the Towner's programme.

Learning and community programmes

The Towner Art Gallery works as an educational arts centre, delivering programmes to thousands of people of all ages. In the process, it works with schools, colleges, libraries, museums, health care providers, youth services, universities and community groups.

Annual Schools Exhibition

The Gallery's Annual Schools Exhibition is one of the largest regular displays of artwork by children at schools in the United Kingdom.

Eastbourne Sunshine Carnival

The Gallery participates in the annual local carnival, running workshops  to create artwork with local schools for public display and celebration.

Arts Award

The Gallery offers support for the national Arts Award programme of qualifications, for ages 5 to 25. It has been given 'Good Practice' status by Trinity College, London and Arts Council England, "in recognition of the depth and breadth of creative practice."

Fuse Box

The Gallery has a learning room called Fuse Box, which offers a changing interactive environment designed alongside the temporary exhibitions in the main gallery space.

The Sussex Open

The Gallery holds an annual public competition, accepting submissions from artists in the region, for exhibition and acceptance into the permanent collection. Artists who have previously been first exhibited in this exhibition, have gone on to be selected for John Moore's Painting Prize, the Jerwood Drawing Prize, the BFI Film Festival in the experimental film category and have been shortlisted for the Mark Tanner Sculpture Prize.

In 2017, the catchment area was expanded to include artists based in West Sussex, as well as East Sussex where the Gallery is based. Categories for submission cover a range of media: painting, photography, drawing, film, ceramics and sculpture.

See also
Eastbourne

References

External links

Towner Eastbourne's Website — The official gallery's website..
Eastbourne.gov.uk — Towner on Eastbourne Borough Council's website.

Art museums and galleries in East Sussex
Contemporary art galleries in England
Modern art museums
Museums in East Sussex
Buildings and structures in Eastbourne
Art museums established in 1920
1920 establishments in England